The Wiener Sport-Club, sometimes abbreviated as WSC, was established in 1883 in Vienna, Austria and is one of the country's oldest athletics clubs. Their traditional home is in the Dornbach quarter of the city (17th district).

History
At various times throughout its history the club has had departments for fencing, boxing, wrestling, cycling, handball, track and field, field hockey, tennis, squash, football and water polo. The football team enjoyed success in Austria National Championship in 1922, 1958 and 1959. Their 1958 season included an impressive 7–0 victory over Juventus in European Champions Cup. Two bankruptcies in the 1990s eventually led the team to slip into the lower leagues.

In 2001, the football section split off as Wiener Sportklub due to financial troubles and was re-integrated back into WSC in 2017. The first squad currently plays in the Austrian Regional League East (3rd Division). The club's home ground Wiener Sport-Club Stadium (or Wiener Sport-Club Platz in German) dates back to 1904 and is considered as Austria's oldest actively used football field. Player and coach Erich Hof is known as the club's legend.

Honours

Austrian Champions (3): 1921–22, 1957–58, 1958–59
Austrian Cup Winner (1): 1922–23
Austrian Football First League Winner (1): 1976–77
Austrian Regional League East Winner (1): 2001–02

Club staff

 Manager: Robert Weinstabl

Current squad

Notable players
  Hans Krankl
  Eric Barber
  Erich Hof
  Lorin Avădanei
  Finn Laudrup
  Julius Emanche
  Horst Blankenburg
  Lothar Ulsaß
  Christian Keglevits

Notable coaches
  Erich Hof
  Antoni Brzeżańczyk
  Slobodan Batricevic
 Goalkeeper Coach:  Mirko Radulovic

External links
 Wiener Sport-Club online 
 Wiener Sport-Club football section 
 Soccerway profile

 
Football clubs in Austria
Football clubs in Vienna
Football clubs from former German territories
Association football clubs established in 1883
1883 establishments in Austria